The economy of the Province of Cebu is the largest in the Philippines according to the Philippine Statistics Authority. In 2019, the Cebuano economy peaked at $6 billion, making it the largest in the nation.

According to COA, Cebu has been currently reigning as one of the most populous province and the most richest province in the region for 8 consecutive times.

Ceboom 
"Ceboom" is a combination of the term Cebu and boom. It is primarily described the province's rapid economical development in 1990. Before the event of Ceboom, Cebu was primarily crossed by  Typhoon Mike. It damaged thousands of houses in Cordova and leaving ships sinking. After the  incident, renovation and construction were started and two major shopping companies opened in Cebu, ShoeMart or SM (now as SMPH) and Ayala opened that period. More projects were proposed and the Marcelo Fernan Bridge was constructed then after.

References 

Cebu
Cebu